Ghan Shyam Yadav Ahir is a Nepalese politician, belonging to the Communist Party of Nepal (Maoist). Yadav is the Rupandehi District Secretary of CPN(Maoist).  In the 2008 Constituent Assembly election he was elected from the Rupandehi-1 constituency, winning 12624 votes.

References

Living people
People from Rupandehi District
Communist Party of Nepal (Maoist Centre) politicians
Nepalese atheists
Year of birth missing (living people)

Members of the 1st Nepalese Constituent Assembly